Kovdozero is a rural locality (a Selo) in Kandalakshskiy District of Murmansk Oblast, Russia. The village is located beyond the Arctic circle. It is 35 m above sea level.

References

Rural localities in Murmansk Oblast
Kandalakshsky District